Brian David Scalabrine (born March 18, 1978), nicknamed the "White Mamba", is an American former professional basketball player who is currently a television analyst for the Boston Celtics of the National Basketball Association (NBA). He is also the co-host of "The Starting Lineup", which airs weekdays from 7 a.m. to 10 a.m. ET on SiriusXM NBA Radio.

Raised in Enumclaw, Washington, Scalabrine attended the University of Southern California after transferring from Highline College. As a member of the USC Trojans men's basketball team, Scalabrine was the top scorer and a leader in field goals and rebounds. He also played at the center position in college.

The New Jersey Nets selected him in the second round of the 2001 NBA draft. The Nets made consecutive NBA Finals his first two years, and Scalabrine played four seasons with the team. In 2005, he signed with the Boston Celtics and won a championship with the team in 2008. The Celtics also appeared in the 2010 NBA Finals. Scalabrine signed with the Chicago Bulls the following season, and played with them until 2012. Throughout his NBA career, Scalabrine served as a backup power forward.

In 2013, Mark Jackson announced that Scalabrine would join his Golden State Warriors coaching staff. In 2014, Scalabrine took a job as an analyst for Celtics games on local Boston broadcasts.

Early life and college
Born in Long Beach, California, Scalabrine was one of four children in his family and graduated from Enumclaw High School at Enumclaw, Washington in 1996. He is of Italian ancestry. He enrolled at Highline College in 1996, played his first year with its basketball team the Thunderbirds, and redshirted his second year. As a freshman at Highline, Scalabrine averaged 16.3 points, 9.6 rebounds, 2.9 assists and 1.2 steals per game. Scalabrine recorded seventeen double-doubles, and led the team in rebounds, blocks, and free throw percentage (75%). The Thunderbirds went 31-1 in the 1996–97 season and won the state junior college championship. Scalabrine was a Northern Division All-Star in 1997 as well as part of the All-Northwest Athletic Association of Community Colleges Championship Tournament Team.

In 1998, he transferred to the University of Southern California (USC). In his first year with the USC Trojans, he was the only player to start all 28 games. He led the Trojans in scoring (14.6 points), rebounding (6.4), and field goals (53.1%). In scoring, blocked shots, and field goals, he was also the only Pac-10 conference player among the top 10 players in those areas. His best game performance was against American University on December 21, 1998: 26 points, seven rebounds, and two blocks. On February 13, 1999, he scored 22 points including an important three-pointer in overtime; the unranked USC won an upset victory over number-six Stanford 86-82 in overtime. He was the 1999 Pac-10 Newcomer of the Year and earned an All-Pac-10 honorable mention.

During his second season with USC, Scalabrine was named to the All-Pac-10 first team and the National Association of Basketball Coaches All-District 15 first team. He also earned a Sporting News All-American honorable mention. Again, he finished as USC's top scorer (17.8 ppg) and field goal shooter (53.1%) and was also the second-best Pac-10 scorer. He also made 40.3% of attempted three-pointers. Against the Oregon Ducks, Scalabrine scored 29 points and made 10 rebounds.

USC advanced to the NCAA tournament in 2001, Scalabrine's senior season. In the Elite Eight round, USC lost to Duke 79-69; Scalabrine scored 13 points. Scalabrine graduated with a degree in history.

Career

New Jersey Nets (2001–2005) 
Because he injured his fifth metatarsal bone during workouts in late September 2001, Scalabrine missed the first ten days of New Jersey Nets training camp. During the second quarter of the final 2001–02 preseason game, which took place against the Detroit Pistons on October 26, 2001, Scalabrine again injured his right foot.  He made his NBA debut on January 31, 2002, when the Nets played against the Milwaukee Bucks. As a rookie, Scalabrine averaged 2.1 points, 1.8 rebounds, and 0.8 assists per game. He played in six playoff games his debut season and averaged 0.3 points and 0.5 rebounds. The Nets were the Eastern Conference Champions of the 2001–02 season and lost the 2002 NBA Finals to the Los Angeles Lakers in four games. In a triple-overtime victory over the Detroit Pistons in Game 5 of the 2004 Eastern Conference Semifinal series, Scalabrine scored a career high 17 points. He surpassed that high with 29 points on January 26, 2005 against the Golden State Warriors. On April 15, 2005, he played a career high 45 minutes.

During his time with the Nets, Scalabrine gained the nickname "Veal", a play on words based on the dish veal scaloppini.

Boston Celtics (2005–2010) 
On August 2, 2005, Scalabrine signed a five-year contract with the Boston Celtics. A month earlier, he and the team agreed on terms that the contract be worth $15 million over the five years.

Scalabrine started in nine of 48 games during the 2007–08 season, and played on average 10.7 minutes. He averaged 1.8 points and 1.6 rebounds per game. On April 16, 2008, in the final game of the regular season, Scalabrine tied a season-high with six rebounds and played 29 minutes.  He did not make an appearance in the NBA playoffs. In the 2008 Finals, the Celtics defeated the Lakers in six games.

Chicago Bulls (2010–2011) 

On September 21, 2010, Scalabrine agreed to a non-guaranteed contract with the Chicago Bulls. The Bulls visited the Boston Celtics on November 5, 2010, and in double overtime the Bulls won 110-105. Scalabrine played only three minutes that game. He played 18 games with the Bulls and averaged 1.1 points and 0.4 rebounds per game.

Treviso (2011)
On September 22, 2011, during the 2011 NBA lockout, Scalabrine signed with the Italian team Benetton Treviso. He left the team in December 2011 to pursue opportunities in the NBA after the lockout had ended.

Return to Chicago (2011–2012) 
On December 12, 2011, Scalabrine re-signed with the Bulls.  During the 2011-12 season, Scalabrine played in 28 games.  In September 2012, he was offered a position as an assistant coach for the Bulls under Tom Thibiodeau, but instead opted to become a broadcaster for the Boston Celtics.

BIG3 League (2017) 
In 2017, Brian joined the Ball Hogs of the BIG3 basketball league.

Coaching career 
In July 2013, Golden State Warriors coach Mark Jackson announced via Twitter that Scalabrine was joining his coaching staff. During the season, Jackson reassigned Scalabrine to the Warriors' D-League affiliate after a difference of opinion on the team's direction.

Broadcasting career
In September 2012, Scalabrine announced that he had turned down an opportunity to become an assistant coach with the Bulls so that he could join Comcast SportsNet New England as a commentator. Scalabrine described the job as "a trial run", and said there was a "small possibility" he would resume his playing career overseas in 2013.

In 2014, Scalabrine wrote an essay to Boston to announce his "homecoming" to become a Comcast SportsNet announcer. His essay spoofed a famous Sports Illustrated story about LeBron James's return to Cleveland.

Personal life
Scalabrine married Kristen Couch in 2003; their wedding ceremony was held in Hawaii. They have two children. He is also a member of the sports philanthropy organization Athletes for Hope.

Fan support 
Despite his limited playing time, Scalabrine became a popular player. Bulls fans referred to him as "The White Mamba", a play on Kobe Bryant's nickname of "The Black Mamba".

In 2013 in response to criticism over him being in a bench role throughout his career and to claims that many would beat him 1-on-1 Scalabrine stated "I'm closer to LeBron than you are to me", suggesting that there is a huge difference between any (active or retired) NBA player and the majority of those outside the league.
In an event organized by The Toucher and Rich Show selected volunteers had the chance to play 1-on-1 against Scalabrine (until 11 points with a margin of 2).
The format was called the "Scallange" and Scalabrine played four games (one against each of the voluntary contenders).
Scalabrine won every game with a combined score of 44-6.
In an additional game Scalabrine played against the three hosts of the show and won 11-1.

NBA career statistics

Regular season 

|-
| style="text-align:left;"| 
| style="text-align:left;"| New Jersey
| 28 || 0 || 10.4 || .343 || .300 || .733 || 1.8 || .8 || .3 || .1 || 2.1
|-
| style="text-align:left;"| 
| style="text-align:left;"| New Jersey
| 59 || 7 || 12.3 || .402 || .359 || .833 || 2.4 || .8 || .3 || .3 || 3.1
|-
| style="text-align:left;"| 
| style="text-align:left;"| New Jersey
| 69 || 2 || 13.4 || .394 || .244 || .829 || 2.5 || .9 || .3 || .2 || 3.5
|-
| style="text-align:left;"| 
| style="text-align:left;"| New Jersey
| 54 || 14 || 21.6 || .398 || .324 || .768 || 4.5 || 1.6 || .6 || .3 || 6.3
|-
| style="text-align:left;"| 
| style="text-align:left;"| Boston
| 71 || 1 || 13.2 || .383 || .356 || .722 || 1.6 || .7 || .3 || .3 || 2.9
|-
| style="text-align:left;"| 
| style="text-align:left;"| Boston
| 54 || 17 || 19.0 || .403 || .400 || .783 || 1.9 || 1.1 || .4 || .3 || 4.0
|-
|style="text-align:left;background:#afe6ba;"| †
| style="text-align:left;"| Boston
| 48 || 9 || 10.7 || .389 || .326 || .750 || 1.6 || .8 || .2 || .2 || 1.8
|-
| style="text-align:left;"| 
| style="text-align:left;"| Boston
| 39 || 8 || 12.9 || .421 || .393 || .889 || 1.3 || .5 || .2 || .3 || 3.5
|-
| style="text-align:left;"| 
| style="text-align:left;"| Boston
| 52 || 3 || 9.1 || .341 || .327 || .667 || .9 || .5 || .2 || .1 || 1.5
|-
| style="text-align:left;"| 
| style="text-align:left;"| Chicago
| 18 || 0 || 4.9 || .526 || .000 || .000 || .4 || .3 || .2 || .2 || 1.1
|-
| style="text-align:left;"| 
| style="text-align:left;"| Chicago
| 28 || 0 || 4.4 || .467 || .143 || .500 || .8 || .5 || .2 || .2 || 1.1
|- class="sortbottom"
| style="text-align:center;" colspan="2"| Career
| 520 || 61 || 13.0 || .390 || .344 || .783 || 2.0 || .8 || .3 || .2 || 3.1

Playoffs 

|-
| style="text-align:left;"| 2002
| style="text-align:left;"| New Jersey
| 6 || 0 || 2.3 || .333 || .000 || .000 || .5 || .0 || .0 || .2 || .3
|-
| style="text-align:left;"| 2003
| style="text-align:left;"| New Jersey
| 7 || 0 || 2.9 || .500 || .000 || .000 || .6 || .0 || .0 || .0 || .6
|-
| style="text-align:left;"| 2004
| style="text-align:left;"| New Jersey
| 9 || 0 || 8.1 || .647 || .833 || .500 || 1.3 || .1 || .3 || .0 || 3.3
|-
| style="text-align:left;"| 2005
| style="text-align:left;"| New Jersey
| 4 || 3 || 15.3 || .182 || .250 || 1.000 || 1.8 || .5 || .3 || .5 || 2.3
|-
| style="text-align:left;"| 2009
| style="text-align:left;"| Boston
| 12 || 0 || 20.5 || .423 || .448 || 1.000 || 2.2 || 1.0 || .2 || .4 || 5.1
|-
| style="text-align:left;"| 2010
| style="text-align:left;"| Boston
| 1 || 0 || 1.0 || .000 || .000 || .000 || .0 || .0 || .0 || .0 || .0
|- class="sortbottom"
| style="text-align:center;" colspan="2"| Career
| 39 || 3 || 10.6 || .437 || .463 || .786 || 1.3 || .4 || .2 || .2 || 2.7

See also

References

External links

 
 USC Trojans bio page
 

1978 births
Living people
American expatriate basketball people in Italy
American people of Italian descent
American men's basketball players
Basketball players from Long Beach, California
Basketball players from Washington (state)
Big3 players
Boston Celtics players
Chicago Bulls players
Golden State Warriors assistant coaches
Highline College alumni
Junior college men's basketball players in the United States
National Basketball Association broadcasters
New Jersey Nets draft picks
New Jersey Nets players
Pallacanestro Treviso players
People from Enumclaw, Washington
Power forwards (basketball)
Small forwards
Sportspeople from King County, Washington
Sportspeople from Long Beach, California
USC Trojans men's basketball players
American men's 3x3 basketball players